Harlan Ware Holden (March 31, 1888 – June 7, 1962) was an American athlete who competed at the 1912 Summer Olympics in the track and field 800-meter run and in the exhibition baseball tournament. Holden was one of four Americans who played for the Swedish team. Harlan attended Bates College in Lewiston, Maine.

References

1888 births
1962 deaths
American male middle-distance runners
Baseball players from Cincinnati
Olympic track and field athletes of the United States
Olympic baseball players of the United States
Athletes (track and field) at the 1912 Summer Olympics
Baseball players at the 1912 Summer Olympics
Track and field athletes from Cincinnati
Air Corps Tactical School alumni
Bates College alumni
20th-century American people